Ram Kumar (born 15 July 1957) is an Indian politician and advocate. He is a former member of the Uttar Pradesh Legislative Assembly from Unnao district.

References

21st-century Indian politicians
1957 births
Living people
Samajwadi Party politicians from Uttar Pradesh